Sutyna is a genus of moths of the family Noctuidae.

Species
 Sutyna colombiensis (Dognin, 1914)
 Sutyna negrita (Hampson, 1907)
 Sutyna privata (Walker, 1857) (syn: Sutyna profundus (Smith, 1900), Sutyna tenuilinea (Smith, [1904]))
 Sutyna leucocyma (Hampson, 1912)

References
 www.nhm.ac.uk
Sutyna at funet

Cuculliinae